Army Appropriations Act refers to several federal acts considered by the U.S. Congress: 
Army Appropriations Act of 1880
Army Appropriations Act of 1901, which included the Platt Amendment
Army Appropriations Act of 1916
Army Appropriations Act of 1919 

United States federal appropriations legislation